Square Chikwanda (born 1972) is a Zimbabwean sculptor, living and working in Harare, Zimbabwe.  He first learned his art from his father, also a Zimbabwean sculptor.

Short Biography
Born in Mvurwi, Chikwanda moved to the Tengenenge Sculpture Community with his father at the age of seven.  There his father taught him at an early age to wash and polish stone.  He finished primary school and learned the art of sculpture to become a full-time artist at the age of thirteen, developing his own style.  At the Community he had several students, of whom Jonathan Mhondorohuma became a good friend.  In 1993 he left the community to work in Harare at the Chapungu Sculpture Park.  At this Park, Square continued expanding his artistic know-how, which made him one of the leading Harare sculptors.  Square now (2006) works on his own in Chitungwiza, a Harare suburb. His work has been exhibited worldwide.

Style
Square's sculptures deal mostly with portraits and animals e.g. "Blind Portrait", Berlin, Germany or "Hippo", Tengenenge, Zimbabwe.  His figures are generally very square and stylised : arms, legs and fingers are often square and show hard lines; noses have knife sharp edges.  His sculptures remind indeed the art-deco figures of the 1930-1940 and are always polished to a high degree of perfection. He uses local Zimbabawean stone, including springstone.

Footnotes

References
Biographical sketch
Friends for ever Zimbabwe
Exhibition Catalogue Friedrichstrasse, Berlin, 2006
Tengenenge-Tomblomefield Museum
Afrika Museum Berg en Daal

Bibliography
 -, "Contemporary Master Sculptors of Zimbabwe", Ruwa, Zimbabwe 2007, p. 57;

Recent Exhibitions
 Annual Heritage Exhibition, National Gallery, Harare, 1986, 1987, 1988, 1992, 1997.
 Museum for Humour and Satire, Bucharest, Bulgaria, 1988.
 National South-African Gallery, Overport, Durban, South Africa, 1991.
 Master Sculptors Of Zimbabwe, Art Center an der Friedrichstrasse, Berlin, Germany, October – December 2006
 Mestres Escultors de Zimbabwe, Museo Comarcal, Montsia d'Amposta, Spain, 21 May-21 June 2009.
 Master Sculptors Of Zimbabwe, Boserup Gallery, Boserupvej 100, Roskilde, Denmark, February 2010.
 Master Sculptors Of Zimbabwe, Sanomatalo Building, Helsinki, Finland, March 2010.
 Master Sculptors Of Zimbabwe, Friends For Ever Gallery, Friedrichstrasse 134, Berlin, Germany, May 2010.

Permanent Collections
 Museum of Tengenenge, Zimbabwe.
 Chapungu Sculpture Park, Harare, Zimbabwe.
 Africa Museum, Berg en Dal, The Netherlands.

1972 births
Living people
People from Mashonaland Central Province
20th-century Zimbabwean sculptors
21st-century sculptors